Paradentiscutata baiana is a species of fungus. It is characterised by introverted ornamentations on the spore wall; the spore wall structure and germ shield morphology. It was first isolated in northeast Brazil, and can be distinguished by the projections on the outer spore surface.

References

Further reading

Silva, Gladstone Alves da, Leonor Costa Maia, and Fritz Oehl. "Phylogenetic systematics of the Gigasporales." Mycotaxon 122.1 (2013): 207–220.
Marinho, Frederico, et al. "Bulbospora minima, a new genus and a new species in the Glomeromycetes from semi-arid Northeast Brazil." Sydowia66.2 (2014): 313–323.
Lima, Ruy Anderson Araújo de. "Dinâmica sazonal de fungos micorrízicos arbusculares (Glomeromycota) em cerradão e brejo de altitude na Chapada do Araripe, CE." (2013).

External links

MycoBank

Glomeromycota